Nicholas Gordon Kingham (born November 8, 1991) is an American professional baseball pitcher for the Diablos Rojos del México of the Mexican League. He has played in Major League Baseball (MLB) for the Pittsburgh Pirates and the Toronto Blue Jays and in the KBO League for the SK Wyverns and Hanwha Eagles.

Career

Pittsburgh Pirates
Kingham attended Sierra Vista High School in Las Vegas, Nevada. In 2010, his senior season, he was 8–3 with a 2.01 ERA in 13 games. After his senior year, he was drafted by the Pittsburgh Pirates in the fourth round of the 2010 Major League Baseball draft out of Sierra Vista High School in Las Vegas, Nevada. He signed with the Pirates for a signing bonus worth $480,000, forgoing his commitment to play college baseball at the University of Oregon. He made his professional debut in August 2010 with the Gulf Coast League Pirates. He spent the 2011 season with the State College Spikes and the 2012 season with the West Virginia Power.

Kingham started the 2013 season with the High-A Bradenton Marauders and was promoted to Double-A Altoona Curve during the season. He was voted to the 2013 Florida State League All-Star Game. He spent the 2014 season with Altoona and the Triple-A Indianapolis Indians. Kingham was added to the 40-man roster on November 20, 2014.

Prior to the 2015 season, Kingham was ranked as the 67th best prospect in baseball by Baseball Prospectus. Kingham underwent Tommy John surgery in May 2015. He would miss the rest of the 2015 season before returning to make rehab starts in July 2016. Kingham finished the 2016 season with 10 starts across the rookie, Class A and Class AA levels. In 2017, Kingham suffered an ankle injury during spring training which delayed his season debut until May.

Kingham began the 2018 season with Indianapolis. He was named International League Pitcher of the Week on April 16, 2018. Kingham made his major league debut on April 29, 2018, against the St. Louis Cardinals. During his debut, Kingham took a perfect game through 6 2/3 innings before allowing a single to Paul DeJong. Kingham went on to record his first career win as the Pirates won 5–0.

On April 30, 2018, Pirates manager Clint Hurdle announced that Kingham would remain in the Pirates rotation, with Steven Brault moving to the bullpen to make room. In 18 games (15 starts), he finished 5–7 with an ERA of 5.21 in 76 innings.

Kingham began 2019 in Pittsburgh's bullpen before moving to the starting rotation. He was moved back to the bullpen in May. He was designated for assignment on June 8 after going 1–1 with a 9.87 ERA in 34.2 innings.

Toronto Blue Jays
Kingham was traded to the Toronto Blue Jays on June 13 for cash considerations, activated on June 15, was designated for assignment on July 18 and outrighted to Triple-A Buffalo on July 21. He rejoined the Blue Jays on August 2. On August 25, Kingham was designated for assignment and released on August 26.

SK Wyverns
On November 28, 2019, Kingham signed a one-year contract with the SK Wyverns of the KBO League. On July 2, 2020, Kingham was released by the Wyverns.

Hanwha Eagles
On November 28, 2020, Kingham signed a one-year contract with the Hanwha Eagles of the KBO League, worth $250,000 and a $100,000 signing bonus. He made 25 starts for Hanwha in 2021, pitching to a 10-8 record and 3.19 ERA with 131 strikeouts in 144.0 innings pitched.

On December 28, 2021, Kingham re-signed with the Eagles for the 2022 season for $900,000. He made 3 starts for the team, logging a 1-2 record and 2.76 ERA with 18 strikeouts in 16.1 innings of work. The Eagles released Kingham on June 2, 2022, due to an arm injury.

Diablos Rojos del México
On February 27, 2023, Kingham signed with the Diablos Rojos del México of the Mexican League.

Personal life
Nick's brother, Nolan, played college baseball for the Texas Longhorns, was taken in the 12th round of the 2018 MLB draft by the Atlanta Braves, currently plays in their organization and led the minor leagues in complete games in 2019 with four and shutouts with three.

References

External links 

1991 births
Living people
Altoona Curve players
American expatriate baseball players in Canada
American expatriate baseball players in South Korea
Baseball players from Houston
Bradenton Marauders players
Buffalo Bisons (minor league) players
Gulf Coast Pirates players
Hanwha Eagles players
Indianapolis Indians players
Major League Baseball pitchers
Pittsburgh Pirates players
SSG Landers players
State College Spikes players
Toronto Blue Jays players
West Virginia Power players